Empty Heart
"Empty Heart", song by The Rolling Stones from Five by Five (The Rolling Stones EP) and 12 X 5
"Empty Heart", song by Rick Astley from 2018 album Beautiful Life (Rick Astley album)